Marina Hegering (born 17 April 1990) is a German footballer. She currently plays as a defender for VfL Wolfsburg and the German national team.

Club career
Marina Hegering began her career at DJK SV Lowick 1930. She played with them for twelve years, most recently in the male B-Youth performance class. At the age of 16, she switched to FCR 2001 Duisburg, for whose Bundesliga team she played until 2011. On August 19, 2007 (Day 1) she made her competitive debut in a 1-0 away win against Hamburger SV. She scored twice on April 6, 2008 (Day 14) in a 7-1 home win against TSV Crailsheim for her first Bundesliga goals. In the 2010/11 season, a persistent heel injury forced her to stay away from the game. During her club affiliation, she won the DFB Cup twice and the UEFA Cup once.

For the 2011/12 season she signed a two-year contract with Bayer 04 Leverkusen.  After recovering from the heel injury, she played her first game for them on April 13, 2013 (matchday 18) in a goalless draw at home against SGS Essen. She joined SGS Essen at the start of the 2017/18 season.  With her team she reached the final of the DFB Cup against VfL Wolfsburg on July 4, 2020 and scored twice but was defeated 4-2 on penalties.

On 24 April 2020, she was signed by Bayern Munich for the 2020/21 season and received a contract that expired on June 30, 2022.

She signed to join VfL Wolfsburg in 2022. She received a contract for four years until 2026. She holds a B+ trainer license.

International career
After Marina Hegering had played in the U-13 Niederrhein selection and the FVN national cup U-15 team, she made her debut on September 3, 2004 as a national player for the national U-15 team, which played the test international match against the selection of Canada lost 1-5. On September 2, 2005, she completed her seventh and last appearance in this age group in a goalless draw against this country selection. She scored a U-15 international goal on 29 August 2005 in a 7-0 win over Scotland, making it 6-0 in the 33rd minute.

For the U-17 national team, she played 22 international matches between October 12, 2005 and July 7, 2007 and scored one goal. Between October 21, 2007 and July 19, 2009, she played eleven international matches for the U-19 national team. She took part with her at the European Championship held from July 13 to 25, 2009 in Belarus. After she played in three preliminary round games, her team went home.

She took part in two World Cups for the U-20 national team, for which she played 18 times. Her first took place in Chile from November 20 to December 7, 2008. She and her team finished third after beating France 5-3. Her second World Cup took place from July 13 to August 1, 2010 in her own country, from which she and her team emerged as World Champions.

She made her debut for the senior German team on 6 April 2019 in Solna in a 2-1 win in a friendly against Sweden national team. For the 2019 FIFA World Cup, she was called up to the squad by national coach Martina Voss-Tecklenburg.  She reached the quarterfinals with the national team.

For the 2022 European Championship in England she was called up by Voss-Tecklenburg in the squad. The German team reached the final, but were beaten by England and became Vice European Champion. Hegering played in all six games. After the tournament, Hegering was voted into the “Eleven of the Tournament” by the UEFA coaching staff.

Career statistics

International

International goals
Scores and results list Germany's goal tally first:

Honours
FCR 2001 Duisburg
 UEFA Women's Champions League: 2008–09
 DFB-Pokal: 2008–09, 2009–10

Bayern Munich
Frauen-Bundesliga: 2020–21
Germany

 UEFA Women's Championship runner-up: 2022
Germany U20
 FIFA U-20 Women's World Cup: 2010, third place: 2008
Individual

 UEFA Women's Championship Team of the Tournament: 2022
 Winner of the Fritz Walter Medal 2009 in gold

References

External links 

 Marina Hegering stats Fox sports5
 Gallery Marina Hegering, fifi.com
 20181028 Interview mit Marina Hegering von SGS Essen Frauen nach dem 0 2 verlorenen Heimspiel gegen

1992 births
Living people
German women's footballers
Germany women's international footballers
FCR 2001 Duisburg players
Bayer 04 Leverkusen (women) players
SGS Essen players
FC Bayern Munich (women) players
Frauen-Bundesliga players
2. Frauen-Bundesliga players
2019 FIFA Women's World Cup players
Women's association football defenders
People from Bocholt, Germany
Sportspeople from Münster (region)
Footballers from North Rhine-Westphalia
UEFA Women's Euro 2022 players
VfL Wolfsburg (women) players